Classic Romance is a 2009 album by violinist David Garrett.

Track listing 
 "Humoresque" (Instrumental)
 "Méditation"
 "None but the Lonely Heart" (Instrumental)
 "Serenade"
 "Zigeunerweisen – 1: Moderato"
 "Zigeunerweisen – 2: Un peu plus lent"
 "Zigeunerweisen – 3: Allegro molto vivace"
 "Salut d'Amour"
 "Vocalise"
 "Mendelssohn Violin Concerto – 1: Allegro molto appassionato"
 "Mendelssohn Violin Concerto – 2: Andante"
 "Mendelssohn Violin Concerto – 3: Allegro molto vivace"

Charts

Weekly charts

Year-end charts

References

External links

2009 classical albums
David Garrett (musician) albums